Thomas Hearns vs. Iran Barkley, billed as Knockout Nite, was a professional boxing match contested on June 6, 1988 for the WBC middleweight title.

Background
In his previous fight on October 29, 1987, Thomas Hearns had captured the middleweight title after knocking out Juan Roldán becoming the first four-division world champion in boxing history.

Then on March 6, 1988, Iran Barkley beat Michael Olajide by technical knockout, becoming a top contender to WBC middleweight champion Thomas Hearns in the process. Two weeks after Barkley's victory, the fight between Hearns and Barkley became official. Having had only one title fight before his fight with Hearns, Barkley came into the fight as a 4–1 underdog.

The fight
Hearns controlled the first two rounds, landing punches almost at will and winning both rounds on all three scorecards. Midway through the first round, Hearns had opened up a cut above Barkley's left eye, and by the end of the second Barkley had a cut above both his right eye and lower lip. In round three, Barkley got off to a quick start, but Hearns took control and hammered Barkley with body shots throughout the round. However, in the final minute of the round, Hearns threw a left jab and then briefly dropped his hands as he attempted to move to his left when Barkley caught him flush with a powerful right hand and then landed another as Hearns fell to the canvas. Clearly hurt from the exchange, Hearns struggled to get back up and barely answered the referee's 10-count. Hearns was allowed to continue, but was immediately met with a barrage from Barkley which sent him through the ropes. Referee Richard Steele would step in and stop the fight giving Barkley the victory at 2:39 of the round.      

The Ring magazine named the fight their Upset of the Year for 1988.

Fight card

References

1988 in boxing
Boxing matches
1988 in sports in Nevada
Boxing on Showtime
Boxing in Las Vegas
June 1988 sports events in the United States